Demuro is a surname. Notable people with the surname include:

Cristian Demuro (born 1992), Italian jockey
Doug DeMuro (born 1988), American car reviewer
Francesco Demuro (born 1978), Italian operatic tenor
Toni Demuro (born 1974), Italian illustrator

Italian-language surnames